A port operator is a port authority or company that contracts with the port authority to move cargo through a port at a contracted minimum level of productivity. They may be state-owned (particularly for port authorities) or privately run.

The work involves managing the movement of cargo containers between cargo ships, trucks and freight trains and optimizing the flow of goods through customs to minimize the amount of time a ship spends in port.  Maintaining efficiency involves managing and upgrading gantry cranes, berths, waterways, roads, storage facilities, communication equipment, computer systems and dockworkers' union contracts.  The port operator also manages paperwork, leases, safety and port security.

Largest port operators
This is a list of the world's largest port operators in terms of total cargo tonnage handled.

Hutchison Port Holdings (Hong Kong, People's Republic of China)
PSA International (Singapore)
DP World (Dubai, United Arab Emirates)
APM Terminals (The Hague, Netherlands)
COSCO (Beijing, People's Republic of China)
EUROGATE (Bremen, Germany)
International Container Terminal Services (Manila, Philippines)
Adani Ports & SEZ (Gujarat, India)

Dubai Ports World was the 6th largest port operator before acquiring then 4th-placed Peninsular and Oriental Steam Navigation Company in 2006.

External links
 How a port operator operates on Slate.com.